The Theatre Royal, was an opera house and performance venue in Wexford Ireland which opened in 1832 and closed in 2005.  It was the home of the annual Wexford Festival Opera, and has now been replaced by The National Opera House.

History
The theatre was constructed by William Taylor in 1831 and opened in January 1832.  It became a major social and cultural focus during the 19th century with frequent performances and visits from touring companies from England.  The amateur Wexford Light Opera Society performed annually in the house.  By 1942, the final private owner sold the building to a consortium, which converted it to a cinema.

However, despite extensive alterations, the stage was retained and the building continued to be used by amateur societies.  The biggest alteration was the removal of "the gods" or upper balcony, replaced by a steeply raked Circle which existed until the building closed (in 2005).  This work caused the loss of the 1960 Opera Festival.

The theatre was acquired by the Wexford Festival Trust in the 1950s and gradual restoration began to take place with an appeal being launched and help provided by the Irish Tourist Board.  In 1973, work was undertaken in the foyers, but another major overhaul of the Theatre was undertaken in 1987, although there was no need to miss a season as happened in 1960.  A new foyer provided a more attractive entrance, extra rows of seats were cantilevered out over the back of the balcony, and many back-stage improvements were undertaken.  
The theatre re-opened on 5 September 1987, in time for the Festival.  This reconstruction allowed the Festival's duration to be extended, and this was further helped by substantial foyer developments in 1993.  Thus, the effect was a 28% increase in capacity per performance and a near doubling of seat capacity for the entire festival by the early 1990s, with sold-out houses being typical.

As the 1990s progressed, the Festival has been able to acquire a number of houses on the High Street behind the theatre.  The result was additional cloakroom, toilets, and bar areas and a smoker's room, and later acquisitions allowed for conversion into offices the potential for direct access from the foyer to backstage without going through the auditorium.  However, the most important acquisition, that of  the old "The People Newspapers"’ property adjacent to the Theatre, was completed in 2000.

Expansion 
The 1832 Theatre Royal was demolished in early 2006 and was replaced by the National Opera House (also known as Wexford Opera House), a building 3½ times larger, on the same site, which provides the Festival with a modern venue of increased capacity.

Compared with the Theatre Royal, the new building includes 
 an increase in seating capacity to 771 to produce a state-of-the-art theatre designed specifically for opera with the auditorium having a rounder shape and an enhanced forestage which will bring audience and performers closer;
 a 176-seat studio space, adaptable as a rehearsal, exhibition and performance space; 
 Improved facilities backstage and front of house for artists and audiences including two foyers, an improved orchestra pit, administrative spaces, and side and rear stages for ease of scenery movement.
 "The Skyview Cafe", open year-round. 
The aim is to be able to operate as a year-round arts venue for additional Wexford Festival productions as well as visiting productions.

The new facility opened on 5 September 2008 with a live broadcast of RTÉ's The Late Late Show.  The first opera presented there was Rimsky-Korsakov's Snegurochka (The Snow Maiden) which opened on 16 October 2008.

See also 
List of concert halls
List of operas performed at the Wexford Festival

References
Colfer, Billy,  Wexford: A Town and its Landscape (Irish Rural Landscape Series), Cork, Cork University Press, 2008. 
Daley, Karina,  Tom Walsh's Opera: The History of the Wexford Festival, 1951-2004, Dublin: Four Courts Press, 2004.  
Fox, Ian,  100 Nights at the Opera : An Anthology to Celebrate the 40th anniversary of the Wexford Festival Opera, Dublin: Town House and Country House, 1991. 
Levin, Bernard, Conducted Tours, London: Jonathan Cape, 1982 . An overview of 12 favourite music festivals, including Wexford.
Wexford Festival Programmes, Wexford: Wexford Festival Trust 1951 - 2008

External links
 Wexford Opera Festival official website
 Wexford Opera House official website
 Wexford Light Opera Society official website

Opera houses in the Republic of Ireland
Buildings and structures in County Wexford
Wexford Festival Opera
Music venues completed in 1832
2005 disestablishments in Ireland
Theatres completed in 1832
1832 establishments in Ireland
19th-century architecture in the Republic of Ireland